William (or Williams) was launched at Blyth in 1811. In 1818 a letter of marque captured her but she was then released. In October 1819 she fortuitously discovered the South Shetland Islands while on a voyage from Buenos Aires to Valparaiso. She was last listed in 1829.

Career
In 1811 William Smith became part owner of William. William first appeared in Lloyd's Register (LR) in 1811.

On 20 November 1817 Williams, Smith, master, of London, was at Bahia. She had been sailing from Buenos Ayres to London when she had encountered the Spanish letter of marque Rita, Atrate, master. The Spanish vessel had been sailing from St Andero and Loango and was on her way to Lima. Rita took Williams into Bahia. After Williams had landed that part of her cargo "supposed to belong to Buenos Ayres", she was permitted to continue her voyage. On 6 May 1818 William arrived at Gravesend from Buenos Ayres and Bahia.

On 2 August 1818 Williams, Smith, master, sailed from Gravesend for Buenos Ayres. She arrived there on 22 October. In July 1819 Lloyd's List reported that she had arrived at Valparaiso from Buenos Ayres. 
In February 1819 William, Smith, master, fortuitously discovered the South Shetland Islands whilst sailing from Buenos Aires to Valparaiso.

Smith had been blown off course in Drake Passage and sighted Williams Point, the northeast extremity of Livingston Island, on 19 February 1819. That was the first land ever discovered south of 60° south latitude, in what is now the Antarctic Treaty area.

(Shirreff had been appointed the commanding officer of British naval forces in the Pacific.)

In October 1819 Smith revisited the South Shetlands, landing on King George Island on 16 October.

Shirreff chartered William to carry a party consisting of Lieutenant Edward Bransfield, three midshipmen, and a ship's surgeon. They arrived in December and surveyed, mapped, and claimed the new lands for Britain. Furthermore, on 30 January 1820, Bransfield sighted Davis Coast on the Antarctic Peninsula. By mid-April William was back at Valparaiso.

On 27 April 1821 Williams, Smith, arrived at Rio de Janeiro from the New South Shetlands. From there Williams sailed to Lisbon.She sailed from Portsmouth to London on 11 September.

Fate
William was last listed in 1829.

Notes, citations, and references
Notes

Citations

References
 Headland, R. (2009) A Chronology of Antarctic Exploration: A Synopsis of Events and Activities From the Earliest Times Until the International Polar Years, 2007–09. London: Bernard Quaritch. (1989 first edition)
 Ivanov, L. General Geography and History of Livingston Island. In: Bulgarian Antarctic Research: A Synthesis. Eds. C. Pimpirev and N. Chipev. Sofia: St. Kliment Ohridski University Press, (2015), pp. 17–28, 

1811 ships
Age of Sail merchant ships of England
Captured ships